Branchville is an unincorporated community located in Mitchell County, Georgia, United States.

History
A variant name was "Faircloth". The present name is after Colonel W. Branch, a pioneer citizen.

References

Unincorporated communities in Georgia (U.S. state)
Unincorporated communities in Mitchell County, Georgia